The Jel Sert Company is a privately held company based in West Chicago, Illinois, United States. Established in 1926, its primary products are snack foods and beverages.

History and products
The Jel Sert Company was named for its original product, a gelatin dessert mix named by combining the words jelly and dessert.  In 1929, Jel Sert created a powdered drink mix called Flavor Aid. These remained Jel Sert's flagship products until the 1960s when the company acquired the Pop-Ice company and its line of frozen ice pop desserts. Later that decade, Jel Sert introduced Fla-Vor-Ice, another freezer pop, to complement its Flavor-Aid line. Fla-Vor-Ice quickly became the leading freezer pop brand in the United States.

In 1991, the company launched the MONDO line of juice drinks and with it a promotional tactic involving the recycleability of their plastic container over conventional individual boxed juice containers.

Otter Pops were acquired by the company in 1996. Similar to Jel Sert's other freezer pops, the Otter Pop brand is perhaps the strongest on the United States' West Coast and features flavor-based characters such as Lil' Orphan Orange, Sir Isaac Lime, and Strawberry Short Kook. In 1999, it signed a promotional deal with General Mills' Honey Nut Cheerios to promote its freezer bars.

In 2000, Jel Sert acquired three other trademarks: Wyler's, a brand of powdered beverage mixes, and the Royal and My-T-Fine brands of puddings, pie fillings, and flan. In 2001 it bought Nabisco's gelatin, pudding and baking powder businesses, including Royal gelatin, one of the main competitors of Kraft Foods' Jell-O.

On July 9, 2012, Jel Sert acquired Super C, Pure Kick and Zoic from Solis Brands.

The Jel Sert Company has done charity work with the American Childhood Cancer Organization, the National Ovarian Cancer Coalition, and Operation Homefront.

In January 2020, Jel Sert acquired All Sport. In February 2020, Jel Sert launched Sliq Spirited Ice. 

Overall, The Jel Sert Company has built a strong presence in the food and drink world. Some partnering brands as of 2022 are:

https://juicyjuice.com/ 

https://www.powerade.com/ 

https://www.skittles.com/ 

https://impactconfections.com/warheads/ 

https://sourpatchkids.com/

https://www.dadsrootbeer.com/ 

https://www.vitafusion.com/ 

and many more. 

Current Social Media 
Over the years, the Jel Sert Company has expanded its social media platforms. Currently, there are Pinterest, Youtube, and Instagram pages to view and explore the company. 

Pinterest:
@otterpops1
@TheRealFlaVorIce
@wylerslight

Instagram:
@flavorice
@otterpops
@wylerslight
@drinkpurekick

Youtube:
@Jel Sert

References

External links
 Jel Sert
 Jel Sert LinkedIn

 
Food and drink companies established in 1926
Snack food manufacturers of the United States
Drink companies of the United States
Food and drink companies based in Illinois
Manufacturing companies based in Illinois
Companies based in DuPage County, Illinois
1926 establishments in Illinois